Scopula subaequalis is a moth of the  family Geometridae. It is found on the Solomon Islands.

References

Moths described in 1917
subaequalis
Moths of Oceania